Černíny is a municipality and village in Kutná Hora District in the Central Bohemian Region of the Czech Republic. It has about 400 inhabitants.

Administrative parts
Villages of Bahno, Hetlín, Krasoňovice, Předbořice and Zdeslavice are administrative parts of Černíny. Zdeslavice forms an exclave of the municipal territory.

References

Villages in Kutná Hora District